The Diocese of San Miguel is a Latin Church ecclesiastical territory or diocese of the Catholic Church in El Salvador. It is a suffragan diocese in the ecclesiastical province of the metropolitan Archdiocese of San Salvador. The Diocese of San Miguel was erected on 11 February 1913.

Bishops

Ordinaries
 Juan Antonio Dueñas y Argumedo (1913–1941)
 Miguel Angel Machado y Escobar (1942–1968)
 Lorenzo Michele Joseph Graziano, O.F.M. (1968–1969)
 José Eduardo Alvarez Ramírez, C.M. (1969–1997)
 Romeo Tovar Astorga, O.F.M. (1997–1999), appointed Bishop of Santa Ana
 Miguel Angel Morán Aquino (2000–2016), appointed Bishop of Santa Ana
 Fabio Reynaldo Colindres Abarca (2017–present)

Coadjutor bishops
 Lorenzo Michele Joseph Graziano, O.F.M. (1965–1968)
 Romeo Tovar Astorga, O.F.M. (1996–1997)

Other priest of this diocese who became bishop
Gregorio Rosa Chávez, appointed Auxiliary Bishop of San Salvador in 1982, cardinal in 2017

Territorial losses

References

External links
  

San Miguel
San Miguel
San Miguel
1913 establishments in El Salvador
San Miguel, El Salvador
Roman Catholic Ecclesiastical Province of San Salvador